German submarine U-268 was a Type VIIC U-boat built for Nazi Germany's Kriegsmarine for service during World War II.

Commissioned on 29 July 1942, she served with the 8th U-boat Flotilla for training and later served with the 1st U-boat Flotilla from 1 to 19 February 1943.

Design
German Type VIIC submarines were preceded by the shorter Type VIIB submarines. U-268 had a displacement of  when at the surface and  while submerged. She had two shafts and two  propellers.

U-268 was fitted with five  torpedo tubes (four fitted at the bow and one at the stern), fourteen torpedoes, one  SK C/35 naval gun, 220 rounds, and two twin  C/30 anti-aircraft guns. The boat had a complement of between forty-four and sixty.

Service history
U-268 departed Bergen on 10 January 1943 on her first and only patrol. On 17 January she sank the  Norwegian whale factory ship Vestfold, which was laden with 17,386 tons of fuel oil, and three British landing craft - HMS LCT-2239, LCT-2267 and LCT-2344 (each 291 tons) - as deck cargo. Before sinking, Vestfold, which had been abandoned with her engines still running, steamed in circles, almost colliding with another ship.

Fate
On 19 February 1943 while returning to her new base in occupied France, U-268 was sunk in the Bay of Biscay, west of Saint Nazaire, at position  by depth charges dropped from a Vickers Wellington bomber of No.172 Squadron RAF. All 44 hands were lost.

Wolfpacks
U-268 took part in five wolfpacks, namely:
 Habicht (10 – 15 January 1943) 
 Falke (15 – 19 January 1943) 
 Haudegen (19 January – 2 February 1943) 
 Nordsturm (2 – 9 February 1943) 
 Haudegen (9 – 10 February 1943)

Summary of raiding history

References

Notes

Citations

Bibliography

External links

German Type VIIC submarines
U-boats commissioned in 1942
U-boats sunk in 1943
World War II submarines of Germany
Shipwrecks in the Bay of Biscay
World War II shipwrecks in the Atlantic Ocean
1942 ships
Ships built in Bremen (state)
U-boats sunk by British aircraft
U-boats sunk by depth charges
Ships lost with all hands
Maritime incidents in February 1943